Telegdy is a surname. Notable people with the surname include:

Ádám Telegdy (born 1995), Hungarian swimmer
György Telegdy (born 1927), Hungarian basketball player
István Telegdy (1927–2013), Hungarian sailor and trainer
János Telegdy (1575–1647), Hungarian Roman Catholic prelate